Anthony Bidulka (born July 24, 1962) is a Canadian writer of mystery, thriller and suspense novels. Bidulka's books have been nominated for Crime Writers of Canada Arthur Ellis Awards, Saskatchewan Book Awards, a ReLit award, and Lambda Literary Awards. In 2005, he became the first Canadian to win the Lambda Literary Award for Gay Mystery.

Biography 
Bidulka was born July 24, 1962, the youngest of three children raised on a farm near Prud'homme, Saskatchewan. He is a Ukrainian descendant.

Though he originally intended to study optometry, Bidulka ultimately received three undergraduate degrees from the University of Saskatchewan: a Bachelor of Arts in Psychology (1983), a Bachelor of Education, and a Bachelor of Commerce. After graduation, he worked as a teacher and CPA before devoting himself to full-time writing in 1999.

Bidulka has been with his partner since 1991, and they live together in Saskatoon.

Awards and honours
Bidulka has been honoured by the University of Saskatchewan, first in 2011 when he was inducted into the College of Education's Wall of Honour, then again in 2020, when he won the Alumni of Influence Award from the College of Arts and Science at the University of Saskatchewan.

In 2014, Bidulka was named the Saskatoon Citizen of the Year. In 2017, he received the Nation Builders Award from the Ukrainian Canadian Community of Saskatchewan.

Publications

 Set Free (2016)
 Going to Beautiful (2022)

Russell Quant series 
 Amuse-Bouche (2003)
 Flight of Aquavit (2004)
 Tapas on the Ramblas (2005)
 Stain of the Berry (2006)
 Sundowner Ubuntu (2007)
 Aloha, Candy Hearts (2009)
 Date with a Seesha (2010)
 Dos Equis (2012)

The Adam Saint Suspense series 

 When the Saints Go Marching In (2013)
 The Women of Skawa Island (2014)

References

External links
Anthony Bidulka

1962 births
Canadian mystery writers
Canadian gay writers
Lambda Literary Award winners
Living people
Writers from Saskatoon
21st-century Canadian novelists
Canadian male novelists
University of Saskatchewan alumni
Canadian people of Ukrainian descent
Canadian LGBT novelists
21st-century Canadian male writers
21st-century Canadian LGBT people
Gay novelists